Angela Casini is a medicinal and inorganic chemist who works on metal-based compounds as therapeutic agents. She was awarded the 2012 European Medal for Bio-Inorganic Chemistry and made the 2019 American Chemical Society Inorganic Lecturer.

Early life and education 
 She earned her PhD in chemical sciences at the University of Florence in 2004. She was a postdoctoral fellow at the University of Pisa, where she worked on the mechanisms by which metal-complexes that are used as anti-cancer agents activate. She used both spectroscopy, including mass spectrometry imaging, and molecular biology.

Research and career 
Angela Casini joined the École Polytechnique Fédérale de Lausanne as a Principal Investigator in 2008. She moved to the University of Groningen in 2011, where she was made a Rosalind Franklin Fellow. She was made a Chair of Medicinal Chemistry at Cardiff University in 2015, and has served as Director of Postgraduate Teaching from 2018. She spent 2016 as a Visiting Professor at the Technical University of Munich.

Awards and honours 
Her awards and honours include;

 2012 European Medal for Bio-Inorganic Chemistry
 2014 Gordon Research Conference Early Career Investigator
 2014 Thomson Reuters World's Most Influential Scientific Mind
 2016 Elected to the Young Academy of Europe
 2018 Burghausen Diamond of Chemistry Award
 2019 American Chemical Society Inorganic Lectureship Award

Selected publications 
Her publications include;

 
 
 

Casini serves on the editorial board of the Journal of Biological Inorganic Chemistry and the Journal of Inorganic Biochemistry.

References 

Living people
Italian women academics
Italian women chemists
Inorganic chemists
University of Florence alumni
University of Pisa alumni
Technical University of Munich alumni
Year of birth missing (living people)